James Kurth (born 1938) is the Claude C. Smith Professor Emeritus of Political Science at Swarthmore College, where he taught defense policy, foreign policy, and international politics. In 2004 Kurth also became the editor of Orbis, a professional journal on international relations and U.S. foreign policy published by the Foreign Policy Research Institute (FPRI) in Philadelphia, Pennsylvania.

Kurth received his B.A. in history from Stanford University and his M.A. and Ph.D. in political science from Harvard University, where he was mentored by Samuel P. Huntington. Kurth taught at Harvard from 1967 to 1973 and has taught at Swarthmore since 1973. He has been a visiting member of the Institute for Advanced Study in Princeton, New Jersey; visiting professor of political science at the University of California at San Diego; and visiting professor of strategy at the U.S. Naval War College. At the war college, Kurth was chairman of the Strategy and Campaign Department, an advisor to the Chief of Naval Operations Strategic Studies Group, and the recipient of the Department of the Navy Medal for Meritorious Civilian Service.  Kurth is a decorated veteran, having served in the Navy in the 1960s on the USS Saint Paul (CA-73), the flagship of the United States Seventh Fleet where he was a deck and gunnery officer.

He is the author of nearly a hundred articles and the editor of two books. Kurth frequently publishes in The National Interest, The American Interest, National Review, The American Conservative, Orbis, Foreign Policy and Current History. He has given testimony before committees of the United States Congress on four occasions. His best-known article is "The Real Clash," published in 1994 in The National Interest, which asserts that the primary threat to the U.S. is not a clash with other civilizations, but an ideological and cultural clash within American society "between the multiculturalists and the defenders of Western civilization and the American Creed." Kurth is also a critic of immigration and feminism (he has denounced feminism as a key factor behind what he calls the "decay of Western civilization" and, in particular, American hegemony), and "suggests that it is perhaps only the influence of the Catholic Church that might curb the excesses of modern liberalism".

His book, "The American Way of Empire: How America Won a World--But Lost Her Way" was published in December, 2019 by Washington Books.

Kurth has served in numerous think tanks, including the Council of Foreign Relations, Coalition for a Realistic Foreign Policy, and The Center of Study of America and the West at FPRI.

Kurth is an evangelical Protestant as well as a traditional social and political conservative; he is an elder at Proclamation Presbyterian Church in Bryn Mawr, Pennsylvania.  He objected to Operation Iraqi Freedom and the broader U.S. push to promote liberal democracy in the Middle East; instead, in "Splitting Islam," Kurth recommends that the U.S. utilize the division between Sunni and Shi'ites to distract radical Islamists from attacking America and the West.

Kurth is a Swarthmore enthusiast. One of few conservative faculty members at Swarthmore, he is known for his provocative courses and formerly, he was also known for the popular opening day lecture of his international politics course.

Essays
 The Real Clash, The National Interest, 1994
 American Strategy in the Global Era, Naval War College Review, 2000
 The Protestant Deformation and American Foreign Policy, The Philadelphia Society, 2001
 The Next NATO, The National Interest, 2001
 The Late American Nation, The National Interest, 2004
 Global Threats and American Strategies: From Communism in 1955 to Islamism in 2005, Orbis, 2005
 The Neoconservatives Are History, Orbis, 2006
 The U.S. Victory in Vietnam: Lost and Found, Intercollegiate Studies Institute, 2006 
 Samuel Huntington: Ideas Have Consequences, Foreign Policy Research Institute, 2009

See also
Who Shall Live and Who Shall Die? DVD, producer, 1982 DVD, producer, 1982

References

External links
 Interview in Swarthmore Bulletin
 Debunking 'American Theocracy' Interview
 Articles at Foreign Policy Research Institute
 Articles at Intercollegiate Studies Institute
 Articles at Swarthmore College
 Articles at Institute for New Economic Thinking
 Articles at JSTOR 
 Articles at America Interest
 Articles at National Interest
 Articles at American Conservative
 Video: The American Way of War: A History of Strategic Transformations 2/3/2005
 Video: What are We Fightin’ For? Western Civilization in the 21st Century 10/27/2008
 James Kurth and the Fate of Western Civilization by Corey Abel
 Interview about "The American Way of Empire"

Conservatism in the United States
Critics of multiculturalism
Geopoliticians
Educators from Oregon
Living people
Male critics of feminism
Stanford University alumni
Harvard University alumni
Swarthmore College faculty
1938 births